Pinky Pal Rajput (Piṅkī Pāla Rājapūta) (born 20 January 1969) is an Indian voice-dubbing actress, Dubbing director and translator who speaks Hindi, English and Marathi.

Rajput is the co-founder of the company and one of the director of Mayukhi in Sync Pvt Ltd, India. (her best friend Anju Jamwal being the partner head executive) which handles voice dubs (Hindi, English, Marathi) for a number of series on History TV 18. The company is also known for handling voice dubs in Hindi and several other regional languages, apart from History TV 18 "Mayukhi in Sync" has done several animated series and features for Cartoon Network, POGO and Nickelodeon. Rajput also serves as the voice of Barbie and as the dialogue translator for the Barbie film series. She has also done many voice-overs for the Hindi dubs of Tamil and Telugu language films.

Dubbing career
She has originally started voice dubbing in Hindi back as early as 1993, when she was a chief assisting director with Ved Rahi for a Hindi serial. There was a need to dub for an actress who caught a sore throat during her shoot. So, her director decided to ask her to go and voice-dub the role for her in Hindi, as it was difficult to get a voice artist at the time of its shooting. Then much later, she went to Sagar Arts and things started from "Shri Krishna". Then she visited Leela Roy Ghosh ("Leela Ji"), where she performed a major breakthrough with The Young and the Restless. Since then, she continued to perform many more Hindi-dubbing voice roles such as for Disney, Cartoon Network, POGO & Nick, Radio ads and radio plays, documentaries and more. She also dubs for television commercials.

Rajput is known as the voice of actress Rambha in movies like Bandhan, Kyo Kii... Main Jhuth Nahin Bolta, and Krodh and also as the voice of actress Monica Bedi in Hindi movie Jodi No. 1.

Rajput has also dubbed for Barbie. After the first four films that were originally dubbed over in Hindi by Rajshree Nath, she passed the role on to Rajput to continue to dub over the Barbie roles in Hindi throughout the later Barbie films. However, There are a few Barbie movies that received two Hindi dubs and she voices Barbie only for the television dub for those films to air on Pogo, with the VCD/DVD release of them, have an entirely different dubbing cast and a new Hindi translation, since it is dubbed by a different studio and that would usually have a different voice actress, other than Pinky or Rajshree.

Rajput is best known as the voice of Little Krishna(more than 200 episodes), in popular Hindi serial Jai Shri Krishna for Colors Channel. She has also lend her voice to the little "Maruti" in "Jai Jai Jai Bajrang Bali" (more than 150 episodes) for Sahara One Channel. She has also done a number of mythological serials like "Sai Baba", "Jai Ganga Maiya", "Alif Laila" and many more.

Filmography

Animated films

Animated series

Live action television series

Dubbing roles

Animated series

Live action television series

Live action films

Animated films

Production staff

Animated films

See also
Dubbing (filmmaking)
List of Indian Dubbing Artists

References

1969 births
Living people
20th-century Indian actresses
Indian voice actresses
Indian women film directors
Indian voice directors
Indian women translators
Film directors from Mumbai
20th-century Indian film directors
Women artists from Maharashtra
20th-century Indian translators
Actresses from Mumbai
21st-century Indian actresses
20th-century women writers